Michael Sheard (18 June 1938 – 31 August 2005) was a Scottish character actor who featured in many films and television programmes, and was known for playing villains. His most prominent television role was as strict deputy headmaster Maurice Bronson in the children's series Grange Hill, which he played between 1985 and 1989. He appeared as Admiral Ozzel in The Empire Strikes Back (1980).

Early life
Sheard was born Michael Lawson Perkins in Aberdeen, Scotland, the son of Donald Marriot Perkins, a church minister. He was educated at Aberdeen Grammar School. He trained at the Royal Academy of Dramatic Art in London and took his mother's maiden name as his stage name. During his national service Sheard was a Royal Air Force aircraftman.

Career
Sheard had a lengthy affiliation with science fiction, and appeared in six televised stories of the BBC science fiction television series Doctor Who, appearing with the First Doctor in The Ark (1966), the Third Doctor in The Mind of Evil (1971), the Fourth Doctor in both Pyramids of Mars (1975) (for which he later recorded a DVD commentary) and The Invisible Enemy (1977), the Fifth Doctor in Castrovalva (1982) and the Seventh Doctor in Remembrance of the Daleks (1988). He also worked with the Eighth Doctor in The Stones of Venice, a Doctor Who audio drama produced by Big Finish Productions. He was a regular guest at both Doctor Who and Star Wars conventions over the years in the U.S. and the UK.

Further to this, he had guest roles in Colditz (1972), On The Buses (1973), Cloud Burst (1974), Space: 1999 and the BBC's adaptation of the Lord Peter Wimsey story The Five Red Herrings (1975) and as Dr. Arnold Anderson in Crown Court (1976).

In 1978, he appeared in one episode ("Sleeping Partners", as the character Adderley) of the television series All Creatures Great and Small. Also in 1978 Sheard appeared as Merton, a forensics expert in an episode of the hard-hitting British police drama The Professionals, the episode entitled "When the Heat Cools Off".

In 1980 he appeared as Federation officer Klegg in "Powerplay" in episode 2 of series 3 of Blakes 7. In 1983, he played Herr Grunwald, the German manager of a building site, in the first series of Auf Wiedersehen, Pet.

Sheard portrayed Adolf Hitler five times in his career: in Rogue Male (1976), The Tomorrow People (1978), The Dirty Dozen: Next Mission (1985), Indiana Jones and the Last Crusade (1989) and the documentary Secret History: Hitler of the Andes (2003). He also portrayed Heinrich Himmler three times, in The Death of Adolf Hitler (1973), The Bunker (1981) and Space (1985).  Although Sheard never played Hermann Göring, he did play Göring's double in the 'Allo 'Allo! episode Hitler's Last Heil.

In 1980, he had a supporting role in Stephen Poliakoff's BBC television play Caught on a Train.

He appeared as Imperial Navy Admiral Ozzel in The Empire Strikes Back (1980), where George Lucas cited Ozzel's death by the force-choke stare by Darth Vader as his favourite movie death scene. Lucas told Sheard at the time that it was "the best screen death I've ever seen". Although Sheard initially regarded Star Wars as "just another part in a very busy actor's career", the role gained him wide recognition among fans and he appeared frequently at Star Wars conventions while an Admiral Ozzel action figure was released.

In February 2005, he played a small cameo role as the narrator in Star Wars the UK fan film Order of the Sith: Vengeance and its sequel Downfall - Order of the Sith, alongside Jeremy Bulloch and David Prowse. These British fan films were made in support of Save the Children.

Personal life
Sheard died of cancer on 31 August 2005, aged 67, at his home on the Isle of Wight, leaving his wife, Rosalind Moir, whom he married in 1961, and three children; two sons: Simon and Rupert and a daughter Susannah A few weeks earlier, on 9 August, he took part in a phone-in on LBCs Iain Lee show, and talked about his career in film and television.

Filmography

The McKenzie Break (1970) as Ingenieur-Offizier Unger
Universal Soldier (1971) as Man (uncredited)
Frenzy (1972) as Jim (uncredited)
The Darwin Adventure (1972) as Man #1
Super Bitch (1973) as Williamson (uncredited)
England Made Me (1973) as Fromm
Holiday on the Buses (1973) as Depot Manager
Soft Beds, Hard Battles (1974) as New Military Governor (uncredited)
The Hiding Place (1975) as Kapteyn
The Sweeney - Hit and Run (1975) as Mr Penketh (headmaster)
Erotic Inferno (1975) as Eric Gold
Rogue Male (BBC Film) (1976) as Adolf Hitler
Force 10 from Navarone (1978) as Sgt. Bauer
Escape to Athena (1979) as Sergeant Mann
The Riddle of the Sands (1979) as Böehme
All Quiet on the Western Front (1979) as Paul's father
The Empire Strikes Back (1980) as Admiral Ozzel
Rough Cut (1980) as Man at Airport (uncredited)
Green Ice (1981) as Jaap
The Bunker (1981) as Himmler
Raiders of the Lost Ark (1981) as U-Boat Captain (uncredited)
High Road to China (1983) as Charlie
The Dirty Dozen: Next Mission (1985, TV film) as Adolf Hitler
Murder Rap (1988) as Defense Counsel (uncredited)
Indiana Jones and the Last Crusade (1989) as Adolf Hitler (uncredited)
Doombeach (1989) as Headmaster
The Darling Buds of May as Building Inspector (1992)
Another Life (2001) as Mr. Justice Shearman

References

Bibliography
 Yes, Mr Bronson: Memoirs of a Bum Actor published in 1997
 Yes, Admiral published in 1999
 Yes, School's Out! published in 2001
 Yes, It's Photographic! published in 2004

External links
 
 Bio at Ancestry.com - shows birth year as 1938
 Obit from The Independent also shows birth year as 1938
 Obituary: The Guardian shows incorrect birth year

1938 births
2005 deaths
Male actors from Aberdeen
Scottish male film actors
Scottish male soap opera actors
Scottish male stage actors
Scottish male television actors
Deaths from cancer in England
Alumni of RADA
People educated at Aberdeen Grammar School